Rolf Agop (11 June 1908 – 15 October 1998) was a German conductor and academic teacher of Armenian descent.

Career 
Born in Munich where he studied, Agop worked first for the Bayerische Landesbühne, a touring theatre, and then for three years as Kapellmeister and choir director at the Kärntner Grenzland-Theater in Klagenfurt. From 1945 to 1948 he was Kapellmeister at the Nürnberg Opera.

In 1949 Agop taught conducting at the Hochschule für Musik Detmold. From 1950 to 1952 he was the first principal conductor of the newly formed Nordwestdeutsche Philharmonie. He then was Generalmusikdirektor of the Dortmunder Philharmoniker. From 1962 to 1964 he conducted the Malmö Symphony Orchestra, and from 1962 to 1976 the Siegerlandorchester, later called Philharmonie Südwestfalen. He died in Hilchenbach.

References 

1908 births
1998 deaths
Musicians from Munich
German male conductors (music)
People from the Kingdom of Bavaria
Academic staff of the Hochschule für Musik Detmold
20th-century German conductors (music)
20th-century German male musicians
Recipients of the Cross of the Order of Merit of the Federal Republic of Germany